This is a list of dissenting academies, English and Welsh educational institutions run by Dissenters to provide an education, and often a vocational training as a minister of religion, outside the Church of England. It runs from the English Restoration of 1660, which created a parallel educational system as a side-effect, to the end of the 18th century.

East Anglia

London area

Midlands

North

South

South-West

Wales

See also
 List of dissenting academies (19th century)
 :Category:Dissenting academy tutors

Notes

References

External links
List at Dissenting Academies Online.

1660-1800
History of education in England
United Kingdom religion-related lists
United Kingdom education-related lists
Lists of schools in England
Lists of schools in Wales